Khok Sung may refer to:
Khok Sung District in Sa Kaeo Province, Thailand
Khok Sung, Nakhon Ratchasima, a township municipality and subdistrict in Mueang Nakhon Ratchasima District, Nakhon Ratchasima Province, Thailand